This is a list of Croatian exonyms for cities, towns, and villages located in Hungary.

While some of these exonyms – such as Budimpešta for Budapest and Pečuh for Pécs – are widely used in Croatian, most of them are used exclusively by the Croatian minority in Hungary and, as of the early 21st century, many of them are either historical or used only by the elderly members of the community.

Bács-Kiskun County (Bačko-kiškunska županija)

Bácsalmás Subregion (Aljmaški kotar) 
 Bácsalmás: Aljmaš, Bačaljmaš
 Bácsszőlős: Prlković, Perleković, Crvena šuma
 Csikéria: Čikerija
 Katymár: Kaćmar
 Madaras: Madaraš
 Mátételke: Matević
 Tataháza: Tataza

Baja Subregion (Bajski kotar) 
 Bácsbokod: Bikić
 Bácsborsód: Boršot
 Bácsszentgyörgy: Đurić
 Bátmonostor: Monoštorlija
 Csátalja: Čatalija
 Csávoly: Čavolj
 Dávod: Dautovo
 Dunafalva: Topolovac
 Érsekcsanád: Čanad, Čenad
 Érsekhalma: Loma
 Felsőszentiván: Gornji Sveti Ivan, Gornji Sentivan
 Hercegszántó: Santovo
 Nagybaracska: Baračka
 Nemesnádudvar: Dudvar, Nadvar
 Rém: Rim
 Sükösd: Čikuzda
 Szeremle: Srimljan
 Vaskút: Baškut, Vaškut

Jánoshalm Subregion (Jankovački kotar) 
 Jánoshalma: Jankovac
 Kéleshalom: Kilaš
 Mélykút: Miljkut

Kalocsa Subregion (Kalački kotar) 
 Bátya: Baćin, Baćino
 Drágszél: Draga
 Dunaszentbenedek: Sabendak
 Dunatetétlen: Tatilan
 Dusnok: Dušnok
 Fajsz: Fajsin
 Foktő: Voktov
 Géderlak: Gider
 Hajós: Ajoš, Hajoš
 Harta: Hartava, Karta
 Homokmégy: Mieđa
 Kalocsa: Kalača, Kaloča
 Miske: Miška
 Öregcsertő: Čerta
 Solt: Šolta
 Szakmár: Kmara
 Uszód: Vusad

Kecskemét Subregion (Kečkemetski kotar) 
 Kecskemét: Kečkemet, Kečkemit

Kiskőrös Subregion (Kireški kotar) 
 Császártöltés: Tetiš, Tuotiš
 Csengőd: Čengid
 Imrehegy: Delavnjača
 Kecel: Keceja, Kecielj
 Kiskőrös: Kireš, Kereša
 Soltvadkert: Vakier
 Tabdi: Tobdin

Kiskunhalas Subregion (Olaški kotar) 
 Balotaszállás: Blato
 Harkakötöny: Kotinj
 Kelebia: Kelebija
 Kiskunhalas: Olaš, Halaš
 Kisszállás: Salašica
 Kunfehértó: Fertov, Vertov
 Pirtó: Pirtov

Kiskunmajsa Subregion (Kiškunmajski kotar) 
 Kömpöc: Kempac, Kompac

Kunszentmiklós Subregion (Kunsentmikloški kotar) 
 Apostag: Štagara
 Dunavecse: Večica

Baranya County (Baranjska županija)

Komló Subregion (Komlovski kotar) 
 Bodolyabér: Đabir
 Hegyhátmaróc: Maroca
 Hosszúhetény: Hetinj, Etinj, Hetin, Jetin
 Köblény: Kubin
 Komló: Komlov
 Magyaregregy: Gređa
 Magyarszék: Sika
 Mecsekpölöske: Pliške
 Szalatnak: Slatnik
 Szárász: Sras
 Tófű: Tofij
 Vékény: Vikinj

Mohács Subregion (Mohački kotar) 
 Babarc: Babrac
 Bár: Bar, Švapčaluk
 Belvárdgyula: Belvar, Belavar
 Bóly: Boja
 Borjád: Borjat
 Dunaszekcső: Sečuv, Sečuj, Sečuh
 Erdősmárok: Marok
 Feked: Feketić, Fejket
 Geresdlak: Gereš
 Görcsönydoboka: Duboka, Garčin, Gerčin
 Hásságy: Ašađ
 Himesháza: Imeš, Imešaz, Nemišaz, Nimeš
 Homorúd: Kalinjača, Vomrud
 Kisbudmér: Mali Budmir
 Kisnyárád: Narad, Šnarad
 Kölked: Kuljket, Kulked
 Lánycsók: Lančug, Lančuk
 Lippó: Lipovo
 Liptód: Litoba
 Majs: Majša, Majiš
 Maráza: Maraza
 Máriakéménd: Kemed
 Mohács: Mohač
 Monyoród: Minjorod
 Nagybudmér: Veliki Budmir
 Nagynyárád: Veliki Narad, Narad, Jarad, Njarad, Narod, Njarod
 Olasz: Olas
 Palotabozsok: Božuk
 Sárok: Šarok
 Sátorhely: Šatorišće, Šatorište
 Somberek: Šumberak, Šumbrig
 Szajk: Sajka
 Szebény: Sebinj, Sevenj, Sebin
 Szederkény: Surdukinj, Surgetin
 Szűr: Sur
 Töttös: Titoš
 Udvar: Dvor 
 Véménd: Vemen, Vimen
 Versend: Vršenda

Pécs Subregion (Pečuški kotar) 
 Áta: Ata
 Aranyosgadány: Ranjoš
 Baksa: Bokšica
 Bosta: Boštin
 Birján: Birjan
 Bogád: Bogadin, Borovo
 Cserkút: Čerkut
 Egerág: Egrag, Jegrag
 Ellend: Elen, Lenda
 Görcsöny: Garčin
 Gyód: Đoda
 Husztót: Gustot
 Keszü: Kesuj, Kesa, Kesin
 Kisherend: Renda
 Kozármisleny: Mišljen
 Kökény: Kukinj
 Kővágószőlős: Kovasiluš
 Lothárd: Lotar
 Magyarsarlós: Šaroš
 Nagykozár: Kozar
 Ócsárd: Ovčar
 Pécs: Pečuh
 Pécsudvard: Udvar
 Pellérd: Pellérd
 Pogány: Pogan
 Regenye: Reginja, Regenja
 Romonya: Rumenja
 Szalánta: Salanta
 Szemely: Semelj
 Szilvás: Silvaš
 Szőke: Suka
 Szőkéd: Sukit
 Tengeri: Tengarin
 Téseny: Tišnja

Pécsvárad Subregion (Pečvarski kotar) 
 Apátvarasd: Varažda
 Berkesd: Berkuš
 Erdősmecske: Mečka
 Erzsébet: Setržebet
 Fazekasboda: Bodica
 Hidas: Idoš
 Kátoly: Katolj
 Kékesd: Kikoš, Kekeš
 Lovászhetény: Jetinj
 Martonfa: Martofa, Mortona
 Mecseknádasd: Nadoš, Nadaš
 Nagypall: Palija
 Ófalu: Faluv
 Pécsvárad: Pečvar
 Pereked: Prekad
 Szellő: Seluv
 Zengővárkony: Vakonja

Sásd Subregion (Šaški kotar) 
 Bikal: Bikala
 Gerényes: Grenjiš
 Gödre: Đudre
 Mágocs: Magoč
 Mekényes: Mekinjiš, Mekinjaš
 Oroszló: Raslovo
 Sásd: Šaš
 Tékes: Tikeš
 Vásárosdombó: Dubovac

Sellye Subregion (Šeljinski kotar) 
 Baranyahídvég: Idvik
 Besence: Bešenca
 Bogdása: Bogdašin
 Csányoszró: Ostrovo
 Drávafok: Fok, Fokrta
 Drávaiványi: Ivanidba
 Drávakeresztúr: Križevce
 Drávasztára: Starin
 Felsőszentmárton: Martince, Martinci
 Kemse: Kemša
 Kórós: Korša
 Markóc: Markovce
 Marócsa: Marača, Maroč
 Okorág: Okrag
 Piskó: Piškiba
 Sellye: Šeljin
 Sósvertike: Vertiga, Vertika
 Vajszló: Vajslovo
 Vejti: Vejtiba, Vertiba
 Zaláta: Zalat

Siklós Subregion (Šikloški kotar) 
 Alsószentmárton: Semartin
 Babarcszőlős: Pabac, Babac
 Beremend: Breme, Brime
 Bisse: Bišira
 Csarnóta: Crnota
 Diósviszló: Visov
 Drávacsehi: Čeja
 Drávapalkonya: Palkanja
 Drávaszabolcs: Saboč, Sabloč
 Drávaszerdahely: Sredalj
 Egyházasharaszti
 Garé: Girija
 Gordisa: Grdiša
 Harkány: Harkanj, Arkanj
 Illocska: Iločac
 Ipacsfa: Pačva
 Ivánbattyán: Ivanj
 Kásád: Kašad
 Kisdér: Dirovo, Kizdir
 Kisharsány: Aršanjac
 Kisjakabfalva: Jakubovo
 Kiskassa: Kaša
 Kislippó: Lipovica
 Kistapolca: Tapoca
 Kistótfalu: Tofaluba, Kišfalov
 Kovácshida: Kovačida
 Lapáncsa: Lapandža
 Magyarbóly: Madžarboja
 Márfa: Marva
 Márok: Marok
 Matty: Maća
 Nagyharsány: Aršanj
 Nagytótfalu: Veliko Selo, Tofala, Totovala
 Old: Oldince, Olnica
 Palkonya: Plakinja, Palkonija
 Pécsdevecser: Devčar
 Peterd: Peterda
 Siklós: Šikloš
 Siklósnagyfalu: Naćfa
 Szaporca: Spornica
 Tésenfa: Tišna
 Túrony: Turon
 Újpetre: Petra, Racpetra
 Villány: Vilanj
 Villánykövesd: Keveša, Kovaš
 Vokány: Vakan

Szentlőrinc Subregion (Selurinački kotar) 
 Bicsérd: Bičir, Bičer
 Bükkösd: Bikeš
 Cserdi: Čerda
 Csonkamindszent: Senta
 Dinnyeberki: Breka
 Gerde: Gredara
 Gyöngyfa: Natfara
 Helesfa: Eleš
 Hetvehely: Tević
 Okorvölgy: Korvođa
 Szentlőrinc: Selurinac, Selovrenac, Selurac, Selurince, Selerenac
 Velény: Valinje, Valinjevo
 Zók: Zuka

Szigetvár Subregion (Sigetski kotar) 
 Almamellék: Mamelik
 Basal: Bašalija
 Boldogasszonyfa: Gospojinci
 Botykapeterd: Botka
 Bürüs: Biriš
 Csebény: Čebinj
 Csertő: Čerta
 Dencsháza: Denčaz
 Endrőc: Andrec, Androc
 Gyöngyösmellék: Meljek, Mejek
 Hobol: Obolj, Obol, Oboj, Vobol
 Horváthertelend: Ertelen, Retlenda, Hertalan
 Ibafa: Ibaba
 Kétújfalu: Ujfaluba, Ufaluba, Vujfaluba
 Magyarlukafa: Luka
 Merenye: Mrnja, Meren
 Mozsgó: Možgaj, Možgov
 Molvány: Molvan, Molvar
 Nagypeterd: Petreda
 Nemeske: Nemeška
 Nyugotszenterzsébet: Sentžebet
 Patapoklosi: Pokloša
 Pettend: Petan
 Rózsafa: Biduš
 Somogyapáti: Opat
 Somogyhárságy: Rašađ
 Somogyviszló: Vislovo
 Szentdénes: Sedijanaš
 Szentlászló: Laslov
 Szigetvár: Siget
 Szörény: Surinj
 Szulimán: Suliman
 Teklafalu: Dekla
 Tótszentgyörgy: Seđuđ

Csongrád County (Čongradska županija) 
 Deszk: Deška
 Hódmezővásárhely: Vašarelj, Vašarhelj
 Szeged: Segedin
 Szőreg: Sirig

Zala County (Zalska/Zaladska županija)

Keszthely Subregion (Kestelski kotar) 
 Keszthely: Kestel, Monoštor

Lenti Subregrion (Lentibski kotar) 
 Csömödér: Čemeder
 Dobri: Dobriba
 Iklódbördőce: Bredica
 Kerkateskánd: Teškan
 Lendvadedes: Didaš
 Lenti: Lentiba
 Lovászi: Lovasiba
 Pördefölde: Predafeda
 Tormafölde: Tormafed
 Tornyiszentmiklós: Mikuš, Sumikluš

Letenye Subregion (Letinjski kotar) 
 Bánokszentgyörgy: Benesedžodž
 Bázakerettye: Kerek
 Becsehely: Bečehel
 Borsfa: Borša
 Csörnyeföld: Černja
 Kerkaszentkirály: Kralevec
 Kiscsehi: Čejiba
 Kistolmács: Tulmač
 Letenye: Letinja
 Lispeszentadorján: Lupša, Vudrijan
 Maróc: Marovec
 Molnári: Mlinarce, Minarce
 Muraszemenye: Semenince
 Oltárc: Ultarc, Ultarec
 Petrivente: Petriba
 Semjénháza: Postara, Pustara
 Szentliszló: Senislov
 Tótszentmárton: Somarton, Sumarton
 Tótszerdahely: Serdahel, Serdehel
 Valkonya: Vlakinja
 Várfölde: Varfed(a)
 Zajk: Sajka

Nagykanizsa Subregion (Velikokaniški kotar) 
 Belezna: Blezna
 Eszteregnye: Strugna
 Liszó: Lisov
 Nagykanizsa: Kan(j)iža, Velika Kan(j)iža
 Rigyác: Redžac, Ridžac
 Semjénháza:  Postara, Pustara
 Sormás: Šurmaš
 Surd: Šur, Šurda
 Szepetnek: Sepetnik

Zalaegerszeg Subregion (Jagarsečki kotar) 
 Zalaegerszeg: Jagarsek, Jagersek

Zalakaros Subregion (Zalakaroški kotar) 
 Gelse: Gelša
 Zalakomár: Kumar

Uncategorized 
 Budapest: Budimpešta
 Debrecen: Debrecin
 Esztergom: Ostrogon 
 Győr: Jura, Đura, Vjura
 Komárom: Komoran
 Lórév: Lovra 
 Makó: Mako 
 Nyíregyháza: Njiređhaza 
 Ráckeve: Kovin 
 Szentendre: Sentandrija, Sv. Andrija 
 Székesfehérvár: Stolni Biograd
 Veszprém: Vesprim, Besprim

References

Sources 
 

 Exonym
Exonyms
Croatian
Croatian exonyms for places in Hungary
Croatian exonyms in Hungary